Vincent Andrew Schiavelli (November 11, 1948 – December 26, 2005) was an American character actor noted for his work on stage, screen, and television. Described as an "instantly recognizable sad-faced actor", he was diagnosed with Marfan syndrome in childhood.Tom Jacobs (08 September 1991). [ACTOR SCHIAVELLI DECLARES VICTORY OVER MARFAN'S]. The Chicago Tribune, accessed 27 November 2019

Schiavelli gained fame as a character actor, mainly in supporting roles. His better-known roles include Fredrickson in One Flew Over the Cuckoo's Nest (1975), Mr. Vargas in Fast Times at Ridgemont High (1982), the Subway Ghost in Ghost (1990), Organ Grinder in Batman Returns (1992), Chester in The People vs. Larry Flynt (1996), Dr. Kaufman in Tomorrow Never Dies (1997) and ABC executive Maynard Smith in Man on the Moon (1999).

Early life
Schiavelli was born in Brooklyn to Sicilian-Americans John Schiavelli and Katherine Coco. He attended Bishop Loughlin Memorial High School in Brooklyn. He studied acting through the theatre program at New York University and began performing on stage in the 1960s.

Career
Schiavelli's first film role occurred in Miloš Forman's 1971 production Taking Off, where he played a counselor who taught parents of runaway teens to smoke marijuana to better understand their children's experiences. Schiavelli's aptitude and distinctive appearance soon provided him with a steady stream of supporting roles, often in Forman's films, including One Flew Over the Cuckoo's Nest, Amadeus, The People vs. Larry Flynt, Valmont, and the 1999 biopic Man on the Moon.

He played Mr. Vargas, the biology teacher, in the 1982 comedy Fast Times at Ridgemont High, a role he reprised in the 1986 television spin-off Fast Times. He was cast in a similar role in Better Off Dead in which he played Mr. Kerber, a geometry teacher.

In 1987, he starred alongside Tim Conway in the short film comedy Dorf on Golf, and then Dorf and the First Games of Mount Olympus in 1988. In 1990, he played the Subway Ghost in Ghost and in 1992, he played in Tim Burton's Batman Returns as the "Organ Grinder", one of the Penguin's henchmen. He appeared as another villain in the James Bond film Tomorrow Never Dies (1997), as a silent monk in The Frisco Kid (1979), and as John O'Connor, one of the evil Red Lectroids in 1984's The Adventures of Buckaroo Banzai Across the 8th Dimension. In 1994 he appeared in the music video for ZZ Top's "Breakaway", alongside Fairuza Balk and in 1997, was named one of America's best character actors by Vanity Fair magazine. He also made several voice appearances in the animated television show Hey Arnold!. In 2002, he played a children's television show host turned heroin addict named Buggy Ding Dong in Death to Smoochy.

His first television role came in 1972 as Peter Panama in The Corner Bar, the first sustained portrayal of a gay character on American television. His other television credits include The Moneychangers, Buffy the Vampire Slayer, WKRP in Cincinnati, Benson   and Taxi as the priest who marries Latka and Simka. He appeared in the Star Trek: The Next Generation episode "The Arsenal of Freedom" as a holographic salesman, on Miami Vice as a research scientist who conspires to steal a top-secret prototype weapon from his employer, and in an uncredited role in an episode of Punky Brewster. In 1987 he appeared as Lyle, a gangster, in the MacGyver season 2 episode "Soft Touch".  In Highlander: The Series, he played Leo Atkins, a homeless Vietnam War veteran accused of murder in the Season 1 episode "Innocent Man". In The X-Files, he played Lanny, a man with an underdeveloped conjoined twin in the Season 2 episode "Humbug".

Schiavelli was honorary co-chair of the National Marfan Foundation, an organization that serves those affected by Marfan syndrome, from which Schiavelli suffered.

Schiavelli also performed in a few video games, including Emperor: Battle for Dune (as Harkonnen Mentat Yanich Kobal) and as Dr. Hellman in the video game Corpse Killer.

Personal life

Schiavelli was married twice. He and his first wife, actress Allyce Beasley, were married from 1985 to 1988. They appeared together in an episode of Moonlighting, Beasley's television series. They had one son, composer Andrea Schiavelli. Vincent Schiavelli then married harpist Carol Sue Mukhalian on October 23, 1992. They remained married until his death.

Death
Schiavelli died of lung cancer on December 26, 2005 at his home in Polizzi Generosa, the Sicilian town where his grandfather Andrea Coco was born, and about which he wrote in his 2002 book Many Beautiful Things: Stories and Recipes from Polizzi Generosa. He was buried at Polizzi Generosa Cemetery near Palermo, Sicily.

Filmography

Film

Television

References

External links

 
 

1948 births
2005 deaths
Male actors from New York City
American expatriates in Italy
American male film actors
American food writers
American male stage actors
American male television actors
American male voice actors
American male video game actors
Deaths from lung cancer in Sicily
American people of Italian descent
People of Sicilian descent
Tisch School of the Arts alumni
People from Brooklyn
People with Marfan syndrome
20th-century American male actors
21st-century American male actors
People from Polizzi Generosa
Journalists from New York City
James Beard Foundation Award winners
Bishop Loughlin Memorial High School alumni